Rukky Sanda (born 23 August 1984) is a Nigerian actress, film producer, and director.

Early life and career
She was born Rukayat Akinsanya, 23 August 1984 in Lagos State. She began her acting career in 2004 while still a student at Lagos State University and continued after graduation in 2007

Personal life
Sanda is the cousin of Nigerian actor and film producer Bolanle Ninalowo.

Selected filmography
 Lethal Woman (2008)
 Obscure Motives (2009)
 Lovelorn (2012)
 Miami Heat (2012)
 Keeping My Man (2013)
White Chapel
The Seekers
Legal War
Campus Love
Keeping my Man (2013)
Gold Diggin (with Yvonne Nelson)
What's Within (with Joseph Benjamin)
The Relationship (2016) with Eddie Watson Jnr, Lisa Omorodion, and Jennifer Eliogu

See also
 List of Nigerian actors

References

External links

Lagos State University alumni
21st-century Nigerian actresses
Living people
Nigerian film actresses
Yoruba actresses
Actresses from Lagos State
Nigerian film directors
Nigerian film producers
Nigerian women film producers
Nigerian women film directors
1984 births